T. exigua may refer to:

 Tasiocera exigua, a crane fly
 Tetragnatha exigua, a stretch spider
 Teladoma exigua, a cosmet moth
 Thelymitra exigua, a sun orchid
 Thermochrous exigua, an insect with intrinsic mouthparts
 Tremella exigua, a French fungus
 Trivia exigua, a false cowry